Naturally occurring platinum (78Pt) consists of five stable isotopes (192Pt, 194Pt, 195Pt, 196Pt, 198Pt) and one very long-lived (half-life 6.50×1011 years) radioisotope (190Pt). There are also 34 known synthetic radioisotopes, the longest-lived of which is 193Pt with a half-life of 50 years.  All other isotopes have half-lives under a year, most under a day. All isotopes of platinium are either radioactive or observationally stable, meaning that they are predicted to be radioactive but no actual decay has been observed.

List of isotopes 

|-
| 165Pt
| style="text-align:right" | 78
| style="text-align:right" | 87
|
| 260(+260-90) μs
| α
| 161Os
|
|
|
|-
| 166Pt
| style="text-align:right" | 78
| style="text-align:right" | 88
| 165.99486(54)#
| 260(+300-60) μs
| α
| 162Os
| 0+
|
|
|-
| 167Pt
| style="text-align:right" | 78
| style="text-align:right" | 89
| 166.99298(44)#
| 1.1(2) ms
| α
| 163Os
| 7/2−#
|
|
|-
| rowspan=2|168Pt
| rowspan=2 style="text-align:right" | 78
| rowspan=2 style="text-align:right" | 90
| rowspan=2|167.98815(22)
| rowspan=2|2.00(18) ms
| α
| 164Os
| rowspan=2|0+
| rowspan=2|
| rowspan=2|
|-
| β+ (rare)
| 168Ir
|-
| rowspan=2|169Pt
| rowspan=2 style="text-align:right" | 78
| rowspan=2 style="text-align:right" | 91
| rowspan=2|168.98672(22)#
| rowspan=2|3.7(15) ms
| α
| 165Os
| rowspan=2|3/2−#
| rowspan=2|
| rowspan=2|
|-
| β+ (rare)
| 169Ir
|-
| rowspan=2|170Pt
| rowspan=2 style="text-align:right" | 78
| rowspan=2 style="text-align:right" | 92
| rowspan=2|169.982495(20)
| rowspan=2|14.0(2) ms
| α (98%)
| 166Os
| rowspan=2|0+
| rowspan=2|
| rowspan=2|
|-
| β+ (2%)
| 170Ir
|-
| rowspan=2|171Pt
| rowspan=2 style="text-align:right" | 78
| rowspan=2 style="text-align:right" | 93
| rowspan=2|170.98124(9)
| rowspan=2|51(2) ms
| α (99%)
| 167Os
| rowspan=2|3/2−#
| rowspan=2|
| rowspan=2|
|-
| β+ (1%)
| 171Ir
|-
| rowspan=2|172Pt
| rowspan=2 style="text-align:right" | 78
| rowspan=2 style="text-align:right" | 94
| rowspan=2|171.977347(14)
| rowspan=2|98.4(24) ms
| α (77%)
| 168Os
| rowspan=2|0+
| rowspan=2|
| rowspan=2|
|-
| β+ (23%)
| 172Ir
|-
| rowspan=2|173Pt
| rowspan=2 style="text-align:right" | 78
| rowspan=2 style="text-align:right" | 95
| rowspan=2|172.97644(6)
| rowspan=2|365(7) ms
| α (84%)
| 169Os
| rowspan=2|5/2−#
| rowspan=2|
| rowspan=2|
|-
| β+ (16%)
| 173Ir
|-
| rowspan=2|174Pt
| rowspan=2 style="text-align:right" | 78
| rowspan=2 style="text-align:right" | 96
| rowspan=2|173.972819(13)
| rowspan=2|0.889(17) s
| α (83%)
| 170Os
| rowspan=2|0+
| rowspan=2|
| rowspan=2|
|-
| β+ (17%)
| 174Ir
|-
| rowspan=2|175Pt
| rowspan=2 style="text-align:right" | 78
| rowspan=2 style="text-align:right" | 97
| rowspan=2|174.972421(20)
| rowspan=2|2.53(6) s
| α (64%)
| 171Os
| rowspan=2|5/2−#
| rowspan=2|
| rowspan=2|
|-
| β+ (36%)
| 175Ir
|-
| rowspan=2|176Pt
| rowspan=2 style="text-align:right" | 78
| rowspan=2 style="text-align:right" | 98
| rowspan=2|175.968945(15)
| rowspan=2|6.33(15) s
| β+ (62%)
| 176Ir
| rowspan=2|0+
| rowspan=2| 
| rowspan=2|
|-
| α (38%)
| 172Os
|-
| rowspan=2|177Pt
| rowspan=2 style="text-align:right" | 78
| rowspan=2 style="text-align:right" | 99
| rowspan=2|176.968469(16)
| rowspan=2|10.6(4) s
| β+ (94.4%)
| 177Ir
| rowspan=2|5/2−
| rowspan=2|
| rowspan=2|
|-
| α (5.6%)
| 173Os
|-
| style="text-indent:1em" | 177mPt
| colspan="3" style="text-indent:2em" | 147.4(4) keV
| 2.2(3) μs
|
|
| 1/2−
|
|
|-
| rowspan=2|178Pt
| rowspan=2 style="text-align:right" | 78
| rowspan=2 style="text-align:right" | 100
| rowspan=2|177.965649(12)
| rowspan=2|21.1(6) s
| β+ (92.3%)
| 178Ir
| rowspan=2|0+
| rowspan=2|
| rowspan=2|
|-
| α (7.7%)
| 174Os
|-
| rowspan=2|179Pt
| rowspan=2 style="text-align:right" | 78
| rowspan=2 style="text-align:right" | 101
| rowspan=2|178.965363(10)
| rowspan=2|21.2(4) s
| β+ (99.76%)
| 179Ir
| rowspan=2|1/2−
| rowspan=2|
| rowspan=2|
|-
| α (0.24%)
| 175Os
|-
| rowspan=2|180Pt
| rowspan=2 style="text-align:right" | 78
| rowspan=2 style="text-align:right" | 102
| rowspan=2|179.963031(12)
| rowspan=2|56(2) s
| β+ (99.7%)
| 180Ir
| rowspan=2|0+
| rowspan=2|
| rowspan=2|
|-
| α (0.3%)
| 176Os
|-
| rowspan=2|181Pt
| rowspan=2 style="text-align:right" | 78
| rowspan=2 style="text-align:right" | 103
| rowspan=2|180.963097(16)
| rowspan=2|52.0(22) s
| β+ (99.93%)
| 181Ir
| rowspan=2|1/2−
| rowspan=2|
| rowspan=2|
|-
| α (0.074%)
| 177Os
|-
| rowspan=2|182Pt
| rowspan=2 style="text-align:right" | 78
| rowspan=2 style="text-align:right" | 104
| rowspan=2|181.961171(17)
| rowspan=2|2.2(1) min
| β+ (99.96%)
| 182Ir
| rowspan=2|0+
| rowspan=2|
| rowspan=2|
|-
| α (.038%)
| 178Os
|-
| rowspan=2|183Pt
| rowspan=2 style="text-align:right" | 78
| rowspan=2 style="text-align:right" | 105
| rowspan=2|182.961597(17)
| rowspan=2|6.5(10) min
| β+ (99.99%)
| 183Ir
| rowspan=2|1/2−
| rowspan=2|
| rowspan=2|
|-
| α (.0096%)
| 179Os
|-
| rowspan=3 style="text-indent:1em" | 183m1Pt
| rowspan=3 colspan="3" style="text-indent:2em" | 34.50(8) keV
| rowspan=3|43(5) s
| β+ (99.99%)
| 183Ir
| rowspan=3|(7/2)−
| rowspan=3|
| rowspan=3|
|-
| α (4×10−4%)
| 179Os
|-
| IT
| 183Pt
|-
| style="text-indent:1em" | 183m2Pt
| colspan="3" style="text-indent:2em" | 195.68(11) keV
| >150 ns
|
|
| (9/2)+
|
|
|-
| rowspan=2|184Pt
| rowspan=2 style="text-align:right" | 78
| rowspan=2 style="text-align:right" | 106
| rowspan=2|183.959922(19)
| rowspan=2|17.3(2) min
| β+ (99.99%)
| 184Ir
| rowspan=2|0+
| rowspan=2|
| rowspan=2|
|-
| α (.00169%)
| 180Os
|-
| style="text-indent:1em" | 184mPt
| colspan="3" style="text-indent:2em" | 1839.4(16) keV
| 1.01(5) ms
| IT
| 184Pt
| 8−
|
|
|-
| rowspan=2|185Pt
| rowspan=2 style="text-align:right" | 78
| rowspan=2 style="text-align:right" | 107
| rowspan=2|184.96062(4)
| rowspan=2|70.9(24) min
| β+ (99.99%)
| 185Ir
| rowspan=2|(9/2+)
| rowspan=2|
| rowspan=2|
|-
| α (.005%)
| 181Os
|-
| rowspan=2 style="text-indent:1em" | 185mPt
| rowspan=2 colspan="3" style="text-indent:2em" | 103.4(2) keV
| rowspan=2|33.0(8) min
| β+ (98%)
| 185Ir
| rowspan=2|(1/2−)
| rowspan=2|
| rowspan=2|
|-
| α (2%)
| 181Os
|-
| rowspan=2|186Pt
| rowspan=2 style="text-align:right" | 78
| rowspan=2 style="text-align:right" | 108
| rowspan=2|185.959351(23)
| rowspan=2|2.08(5) h
| β+ (99.99%)
| 186Ir
| rowspan=2|0+
| rowspan=2|
| rowspan=2|
|-
| α (1.4×10−4%)
| 182Os
|-
| 187Pt
| style="text-align:right" | 78
| style="text-align:right" | 109
| 186.96059(3)
| 2.35(3) h
| β+
| 187Ir
| 3/2−
|
|
|-
| rowspan=2|188Pt
| rowspan=2 style="text-align:right" | 78
| rowspan=2 style="text-align:right" | 110
| rowspan=2|187.959395(6)
| rowspan=2|10.2(3) d
| EC (99.99%)
| 188Ir
| rowspan=2|0+
| rowspan=2|
| rowspan=2|
|-
| α (2.6×10−5%)
| 184Os
|-
| 189Pt
| style="text-align:right" | 78
| style="text-align:right" | 111
| 188.960834(12)
| 10.87(12) h
| β+
| 189Ir
| 3/2−
|
|
|-
| style="text-indent:1em" | 189m1Pt
| colspan="3" style="text-indent:2em" | 172.80(6) keV
| 464(25) ns
|
|
| 9/2−
|
|
|-
| style="text-indent:1em" | 189m2Pt
| colspan="3" style="text-indent:2em" | 191.6(4) keV
| 143(5) μs
|
|
| (13/2+)
|
|
|-
| 190Pt
| style="text-align:right" | 78
| style="text-align:right" | 112
| 189.959932(6)
| 6.5(3)×1011 y
| α
| 186Os
| 0+
| 1.4(1)×10−4
|
|-
| 191Pt
| style="text-align:right" | 78
| style="text-align:right" | 113
| 190.961677(5)
| 2.862(7) d
| EC
| 191Ir
| 3/2−
|
|
|-
| style="text-indent:1em" | 191m1Pt
| colspan="3" style="text-indent:2em" | 100.67(2) keV
| >1 μs
|
|
| (9/2)−
|
|
|-
| style="text-indent:1em" | 191m2Pt
| colspan="3" style="text-indent:2em" | 149.04(2) keV
| 95(5) μs
|
|
| (13/2)+
|
|
|-
| 192Pt
| style="text-align:right" | 78
| style="text-align:right" | 114
| 191.9610380(27)
| colspan=3 align=center|Observationally Stable
| 0+
| 0.00782(7)
|
|-
| 193Pt
| style="text-align:right" | 78
| style="text-align:right" | 115
| 192.9629874(18)
| 50(6) y
| EC
| 193Ir
| 1/2−
|
|
|-
| style="text-indent:1em" | 193mPt
| colspan="3" style="text-indent:2em" | 149.78(4) keV
| 4.33(3) d
| IT
| 193Pt
| 13/2+
|
|
|-
| 194Pt
| style="text-align:right" | 78
| style="text-align:right" | 116
| 193.9626803(9)
| colspan=3 align=center|Observationally Stable
| 0+
| 0.32967(99)
|
|-
| 195Pt
| style="text-align:right" | 78
| style="text-align:right" | 117
| 194.9647911(9)
| colspan=3 align=center|Observationally Stable
| 1/2−
| 0.33832(10)
|
|-
| style="text-indent:1em" | 195mPt
| colspan="3" style="text-indent:2em" | 259.30(8) keV
| 4.010(5) d
| IT
| 195Pt
| 13/2+
|
|
|-
| 196Pt
| style="text-align:right" | 78
| style="text-align:right" | 118
| 195.9649515(9)
| colspan=3 align=center|Observationally Stable
| 0+
| 0.25242(41)
|
|-
| 197Pt
| style="text-align:right" | 78
| style="text-align:right" | 119
| 196.9673402(9)
| 19.8915(19) h
| β−
| 197Au
| 1/2−
|
|
|-
| rowspan=2 style="text-indent:1em" | 197mPt
| rowspan=2 colspan="3" style="text-indent:2em" | 399.59(20) keV
| rowspan=2|95.41(18) min
| IT (96.7%)
| 197Pt
| rowspan=2|13/2+
| rowspan=2|
| rowspan=2|
|-
| β− (3.3%)
| 197Au
|-
| 198Pt
| style="text-align:right" | 78
| style="text-align:right" | 120
| 197.967893(3)
| colspan=3 align=center|Observationally Stable
| 0+
| 0.07163(55)
|
|-
| 199Pt
| style="text-align:right" | 78
| style="text-align:right" | 121
| 198.970593(3)
| 30.80(21) min
| β−
| 199Au
| 5/2−
|
|
|-
| style="text-indent:1em" | 199mPt
| colspan="3" style="text-indent:2em" | 424(2) keV
| 13.6(4) s
| IT
| 199Pt
| (13/2)+
|
|
|-
| 200Pt
| style="text-align:right" | 78
| style="text-align:right" | 122
| 199.971441(22)
| 12.5(3) h
| β−
| 200Au
| 0+
|
|
|-
| 201Pt
| style="text-align:right" | 78
| style="text-align:right" | 123
| 200.97451(5)
| 2.5(1) min
| β−
| 201Au
| (5/2−)
|
|
|-
| 202Pt
| style="text-align:right" | 78
| style="text-align:right" | 124
| 201.97574(32)
| 44(15) h
| β−
| 202Au
| 0+
|
|
|-
| style="text-indent:1em" | 202mPt
| colspan="3" style="text-indent:2em" | 1788.5(0.4) keV
| 141(7) μs
| IT
| 202Pt
| (7-)
|
|
|-
| 203Pt
| style="text-align:right" | 78
| style="text-align:right" | 125
| 202.97893(200)#
| 22(4) s
| β−
| 203Au
| (1/2-)
|
|
|-
| style="text-indent:1em" | 203mPt
| colspan="3" style="text-indent:2em" | 3100# keV
| 641(55) μs
| IT
| 203Pt
| 33/2+#
|
|
|-
| 204Pt
| style="text-align:right" | 78
| style="text-align:right" | 126
| 203.98076(200)#
| 10.3(14) s
| β−
| 204Au
| 0+
|
|
|-
| style="text-indent:1em" | 204m1Pt
| colspan="3" style="text-indent:2em" | 1995.1(0.7) keV
| 5.5(7) μs
| IT
| 204Pt
| (5-)
|
|
|-
| style="text-indent:1em" | 204m2Pt
| colspan="3" style="text-indent:2em" | 2035(23) keV
| 55(3) μs
| IT
| 204Pt
| (7-)
|
|
|-
| style="text-indent:1em" | 204m3Pt
| colspan="3" style="text-indent:2em" | 3193(23) keV
| 146(14) ns
| IT
| 204Pt
| (10+)
|
|

References 

 Isotope masses from:

 Isotopic compositions and standard atomic masses from:

 Half-life, spin, and isomer data selected from the following sources.

 
Platinum
Platinum